Alexandria Lauren ter Avest or Alex ter Avest (born February 15, 1993) is an American actress.

Early life 
Avest was born in Chapel Hill, North Carolina. She attended Cary Academy. She then attended the University of North Carolina School of the Arts where she studied drama. After high school, she attended the University of North Carolina at Chapel Hill on a fellowship.

Career 
Avest started her acting career in local theater. In 2003, Avest played Alice in the stage production of Alice in Wonderland at the Applause! Cary Youth Theater in Cary, North Carolina. In 2010, she played Janice in the Raleigh Ensemble Players' production of The Effect of Gamma Rays on Man-in-the-Moon Marigolds.

In 2016 she appeared in the film Cell which was based on a book by Stephen King.

Filmography

Television

Film

References

1993 births
Living people
People from Chapel Hill, North Carolina
University of North Carolina School of the Arts alumni
University of North Carolina at Chapel Hill alumni
American film actresses
Actresses from North Carolina
21st-century American women